Nurse education consists of the theoretical and practical training provided to nurses with the purpose to prepare them for their duties as nursing care professionals.  This education is provided to student nurses by experienced nurses and other medical professionals who have qualified or experienced for educational tasks, traditionally in Nursing schools. Most countries offer nurse education courses that can be relevant to general nursing or to specialized areas including mental health nursing, pediatric nursing and post-operatory nursing. Courses leading to autonomous registration as a nurse typically last four years. Nurse education also provides post-qualification courses in specialist subjects within nursing.

A nursing student can be enrolled in a program that leads to a diploma, an associate degree or a Bachelor of Science in nursing.

Historical background

During past decades, the changes in education have replaced the more practically focused, but often ritualistic, training structure of conventional preparation. Nurse education integrates today a broader awareness of other disciplines allied to medicine, often involving inter-professional education, and the utilization of research when making clinical and managerial decisions. Orthodox training can be argued to have offered a more intense practical skills base, but emphasized the handmaiden relationship with the physician. This is now outmoded, and the impact of nurse education is to develop a confident, inquiring graduate who contributes to the care team as an equal. In some countries, not all qualification courses have graduate status.

Traditionally, from the times prior to Florence Nightingale, nursing was seen as an apprenticeship, often undertaken in religious institutes such as convents by young women, although there has always been a proportion of male nurses, especially in mental health services.

In 1859, Valérie de Gasparin and her Husband Agénor de Gasparin opens the first nursing school in the world in Lausanne, Switzerland : L’École La Source

Some other nurses at that time, notably Ethel Gordon Fenwick, were in favor of formalized nursing registration and curricula that were formally based in higher education and not within the confines of hospitals.

Nurse education in the United States is conducted within university schools, although it is unclear who offered the first degree level program. So far as known Yale School of Nursing became the first autonomous school of nursing in the United States in 1923.

In November 1955, a World Health Organization (WHO) study group on the education of nurses met in Brussels and made several recommendations, including that "At least one experimental school of nursing be set up in each country." In the UK, the first department of Nursing Studies at the University of Edinburgh was established in 1956, with a five-year integrated degree programme introduced in 1960. Several other universities across the UK during the 1960s. In 1974 La Trobe University commenced the very first nursing course in Australia.

United Kingdom
Florence Nightingale was one of the pioneers in establishing the idea of nursing schools from her base at St Thomas' Hospital, London in 1860 when she opened the 'Nightingale Training School for Nurses', now part of King's College London. Her intention was to train nurses to a qualified and specialized level, with the key aim of learning to develop observation skills and sensitivity to patient needs, then allow them to work in hospital posts across the United Kingdom and abroad. Her influence flourished and nursing is now a course taught at a number of British universities.

Eva Luckes, Matron of The London Hospital (1880-1919) was mentored by Florence Nightingale, and was her friend and disciple.Eva Luckes was another innovator in nurse training and education and introduced the Preliminary Training School concept to England in 1895. This was adopted as an element of mandatory training programme following the 1919 Nurse Registration Act. Eva Luckes produced over 470 matrons who filled posts at home and abroad, including three who filled the top positions in Military Nursing, Ethel Becher, Sarah Oram and Maud McCarthy. Luckes's other matrons also spread her style of "Nightingale nursing" to voluntary hospitals and infirmaries both in the provinces and London. They included Annie McIntosh, Matron of St Bartholomew's Hospital, 1910-1927.

Apart from the nursing school of King's College London, the direct descendant of Nightingale's school, the University of Manchester was one of the first English institutions to offer the course at degree level. A new building for the Manchester Medical School was opened in the early 1970s and degree courses in nursing were established about the same time. Nursing education at the university expanded greatly in 1996 when a new School of Nursing and Midwifery was created by transferring the Manchester College of Midwifery and Nursing into the university's Faculty of Medicine, Dentistry and Nursing.

Nursing education in the United Kingdom was significantly influenced by the Briggs Report of 1972. This set a new agenda for nursing and nurse education and sought to develop a career progression away from the bedside into education, management and research. In addition, the 1979 Nurses, Midwives and Health Visitors Act provided the legal mechanism for change. This saw a gradual movement away from practice-based training towards a college-based system of education, from the nurse apprentice to the supernumerary nurse.  

Entry level courses, sought by most universities, are often five Standard Grades/GCSEs, including English, maths and a science (preferably biology), and two Highers/A-Levels. Mature students, over the age of twenty-one, have the option of entering upon completion of a college Access course, and experience in jobs related to health/nursing assistance are also worthy for consideration into the course.

Currently, nursing is a three-year course in the UK, with students choosing the branch that they want to study, e.g., adult, child, mental health, or learning disability; or combinations of two (called dual-field). The course consists of a balance between coursework in classes and practical placements in a health care setting. The first year is foundation, where students learn anatomy and physiology and basic health care. Newly qualified nurses then have to register with the Nursing and Midwifery Council in order to apply for jobs and legally practice.

United States
The history of nursing education had a long and varied role in the United States. Before the late 1800s little formal education was available to train nursing students. Education was primarily based on an apprenticeship with a senior nurse who taught bedside care within a hospital or clinic setting. Over time this model changed dramatically. A short chronology of Schools of Nursing in the United States is:

 In 1873, the Bellevue Hospital School of Nursing, of New York City, was founded. It was the first school of nursing in the United States to be founded on the principles of nursing established by Florence Nightingale. The School operated at Bellevue Hospital until its closure in 1969.
 1883: The Medical University of South Carolina College of Nursing has been traced to its beginning in 1883 when the South Carolina Training School for Nurses was established at the request of Roper Hospital (known then as City Hospital) in Charleston, SC. Due to an earthquake in 1886 which destroyed the City Hospital, the effort only lasted a few years. However, once the new hospital was built the nursing program was reestablished in 1895 as the Charleston Training School. In 1916, the Board of Commissioners of the Roper Hospital proposed the transfer of the training school to the Medical College of the State of South Carolina, whose school of medicine had been established in Charleston in 1824 and whose faculty was already providing most of the nursing instruction. The proposal was accepted by both the hospital and the Medical College, and in 1919 the Roper Hospital Training School for Nurses became the School of Nursing of the Medical College of the State of South Carolina. In 1969 when the Medical College was designated the Medical University of South Carolina, the School of Nursing became the College of Nursing.
1889: The University of Maryland School of Nursing (UMSON) was founded by Louisa Parsons, a graduate of the Nightingale Fund School at St. Thomas' Hospital in London. UMSON is one of the oldest and largest nursing schools in the United States. 1889: The Johns Hopkins School of Nursing was founded in conjunction with the creation of the Johns Hopkins Hospital. As one of the earliest hospital-based nursing schools in the United States school leaders consulted with Florence Nightingale on the program of education. These same nurse leaders also established what would become the National League for Nursing Education and helped in establishing the American Nurses Association.
 In 1909, the University of Minnesota offered the first university based nursing program. It offered the first Bachelor of Science in Nursing degree and graduated the first bachelor's degree educated nurse.By 1916, 13 universities and 3 colleges had developed bachelor's nursing degree programs.
 In 1923, the Yale School of Nursing was founded. It became the first School of Nursing to adopt the educational standards from the 1923 Goldmark Report that was requested by the Rockefeller Foundation. The curriculum was based on an educational plan rather than on hospital service needs.
 In 1956', the Columbia University School of Nursing became the first in the United States to grant a master's degree in a clinical nursing specialty.

Nursing qualifications
There are multiple entry levels into nursing.  This has led to confusion for the public, as well as other healthcare professionals.  The earliest schools of nursing offered a Diploma in Nursing and not an actual academic degree. Community colleges began offering an Associate of Science in Nursing degree, and some diploma programs switched to this model.  Universities then began to offer Bachelor of Science in Nursing and Bachelor of Nursing degrees, followed by Master of Science in Nursing degrees, and  Doctor of Nursing Practice degrees.  A Doctor of Philosophy Degree in Nursing (PhD) is also available, although this degree tends to focuses more on research than hands-on patient care.

Nursing degrees in the UK
Pre-registration nurse training and education in the UK is now via a bachelor's degree (a UK Level 6 qualification) or a 2 year pre-registration Master's degree at level 7, following the phasing-out of the Diploma of Higher Education (a UK Level 5 qualification) in Nursing which was previously offered at universities and colleges.

To become a student nurse, individuals must apply through the university and Colleges Admissions Service (commonly referred to as "UCAS") to their nursing degree choices, choosing from one of the four nursing fields: Adult, Children, Mental Health and Learning Disabilities. Requirements for entry to a pre-reg nursing degree are usually five GCSEs (including mathematics, English language and at least one science subject) at Grade C or above, along with three A-Level subjects (preferably but not essentially science-based) at Grade C or above, although the majority of universities will seek higher grades due to the competition for places. Key Skills courses are generally no-longer accepted as an alternative to GCSEs, however science or healthcare-based BTEC Level 3 Extended Diplomas and Access courses are most oftem accepted in lieu of A-Level qualifications.

If successful following interview, the student will study a "core" first year, learning basic nursing competencies essential to all four of the above fields. It is then from second year and onwards that the degree will begin to focus on the student's chosen field. Following completion of the degree, the applicant will be registered with the Nursing and Midwifery Council (NMC) as a Registered Nurse in their field of practice, using the post-nominal RNA, RNC, RNMH or RNLD as appropriate to their degree qualification.

 Nursing degrees in Western Australia 
There are two specific pathways individuals can take if they wish to become a nurse in Western Australia (WA). They can decide to study at university to become a registered nurse (RN), alternatively they can study at Technical and Further Education (TAFE) to become an enrolled nurse (EN). Both pathways require a variety of entry requirements whether it be passing year 12 Maths, English and Human Biology along with receiving a specific Australian Tertiary Admission Rank (ATAR) also known as a score for university or providing prior learning experiences and legal clearances for TAFE.  Either way individuals need to be aware these requirements can vary year to year and that is why they are recommended to contact each university or institute to find out entry requirements.

In WA there are four universities where individuals can choose to attend if they are wanting to complete a nursing degree.

Edith Cowan University (ECU) is located at Joondalup and South West (Bunbury) campus. ECU offers the Bachelor of Science (Nursing) degree which individuals can choose to study for three years full time or six years part time both on campus.

Curtin University is located in Bently, WA. This university offers an Undergraduate Nursing degree additionally referred to as Bachelor of Science (Nursing). This degree runs on campus for three and a half years full time however, students can request to study this degree part time.

Murdoch University also offers offer a Bachelor of Nursing degree with a three-year completion date. The university offers this degree at Peel or South Street campus in Murdoch, WA.

The final university that offers a nursing degree in WA is located throughout Fremantle and is known as the University of Notre Dame. This university offer a Bachelor of Nursing degree which will take three years to achieve.

When students graduate from one of the four universities listed above they will be fully qualified as an RN and have a wide variety of job opportunities available. However, if individuals discover that university is not for them or can not gain entry into university, it is not the end of the world because there are alternative pathways available.

Attending TAFE is an alternative career pathway for individuals that still wish to pursue this profession. There are six institutes spread across WA which offer a Diploma of Nursing (Enrolled-Division 2 Nursing). These institutes include C.Y.O’Connor Institute, Great Southern Institute of Technology, Goldfields Institute of Technology, Pilbara Institute, South West Institute of Technology and West Coast Institute of Training. All institutes in WA roughly take eighteen months to complete the diploma when studying full time. Once a student successfully graduates from the Diploma of Nursing (Enrolled-Division 2 Nursing) they will be qualified as an EN.

Overall, there are alternative pathways available however an RN holds higher qualifications than an EN. There are key similarities of an RN and an EN as they both desire to fulfil their dreams of becoming a nurse and they must be registered with the Nursing and Midwifery Board of Australia, by complying with the Board's registration standards.

 United States curriculum
Pre-requisites often include math, English, and other basic level courses. Basic courses in biology, anatomy and physiology are required. Depending on the nursing school, credits can be taken elsewhere, and transferred in, although limitations on time span between taking pre-requisites and applying to nursing programs exist, usually around 5 years, although some schools set no parameters.

Core coursework includes anatomy, physiology, pathology, and pharmacology. Additionally, a strong emphasis is placed on procedural education such as insertion of intravenous and urinary catheters, sterile dressing changes, proper administration of medications, physical examinations, caring bedside manner, and other vital skills. After the first semester basic skills are obtained, students rotate through Obstetrics, Mental Health, Medical, Surgical, Oncology, Critical Care and Pediatric Units to get a holistic view of nursing and what it encompasses. Many nursing students and nursing schools use medical and healthcare educational software as a study or training aid.

Many schools offer an accelerated bachelor's degree in nursing program. A variation of the Second Degree BSN is the Accelerated BSN. In addition to giving credit for having completed liberal arts requirements, an Accelerated BSN program allows students to complete their undergraduate nursing program's course requirements more quickly than students enrolled in a traditional BSN program. Accelerated BSN programs usually take 12 months to complete, though some programs may run for 16 to 24 months.

The traditional BSN programs may take much longer time. For example, in California, where nursing is a relatively high-paid and in high demand profession, the completion of BSN (including pre-requisites, major courses in the program, and General Education courses of college) may take 5 to 6 years. A 3.0 GPA is often an entrance requirement for many programs. Some more prestigious schools require much higher GPA score to be competitive. Many programs now also require TEAS-V test scores to evaluate potential students for entry.  Also, there are other options of Associate Degree for RN and LPN programs (which in term of nursing training is much shorter and the scope of practice is different than RN). Lastly, the Master level is for experienced RNs to reach a higher education and may expand their scope of practice.

In the United States, students graduate from nursing education programs qualified to take one of the NCLEX (National Council Licensure Examination) exams, the NCLEX-PN for Licensed Practical Nurses (LPNs) or the NCLEX-RN for Registered Nurses (RNs).

Continuing education
After the Nursing student becomes a Registered nurse, he or she is required to participate in continuing education to retain their licensing and registration. In 2010, it was projected that by 2018, there would be a 22% job growth in the nursing field; at the time it was the United States' fastest growing occupation.

 Scope 
Nursing education includes instruction in topic areas. These are nursing assessment, nursing diagnosis, and nursing care planning.  
In the United States, nursing students learn through traditional classroom and lab instruction.  Nursing education also involves clinical rotations and simulation, throughout their schooling, to develop care planning and clinical reasoning.   At the end of schooling, nursing students in the US and Canada must take and pass the NCLEX (National Council of Licensure Examination) to practice.

 Nursing specialties 
There are a variety of areas where nurses can specialise in and they may decide they want to be qualified in one or several specialities over the course of their career. There are four main branches of nursing: Adult nursing, Children's Nursing, Mental Health Nursing and Learning Disability Nursing. Here are an array of some of the nursing specialty fields available:

 Addiction Nurse
 Burn Care Nurse
 Cardiology (heart) Nurse 
 Clinical Nurse 
 Community Health Nurse 
 Continence Nurse 
 Diabetes Education Nurse 
 District Nurse
 Dialysis Nurse
 Education
 Emergency Nurse 
 Family Health Nurse
 Fertility Nurse  
 Gerontology (aged care) Nurse 
 Haematology Nurse
 Infection control
 Intensive Care  
 Management 
 Medical Nurse 
 Mental Health Nurse
 Midwife
 Neonatal Intensive Care Nurse 
 Nurse Educator
 Nurse Manager
 Nurse Practitioner
 Occupational Health Nurse
 Oncology Nurse
 Paediatric Nurse 
 Peri-operative Nurse
 Plastic Surgery Nurse 
 Practice Nurse (Medical Clinic)
 Rehabilitation Nurse 
 Remote Area Nurse 
 Research
 Respiratory Nurse
 Rural Nurse
 School Nurse
 Sexual Health Nurse
 Surgical Nurse 
 Wound Management

Present aims
Among nurse educators, arguments continue about the ideal balance of practical preparation and the need to educate the future practitioner to manage healthcare and to have a broader view of the practice. To meet both requirements, nurse education aims to develop a lifelong learner who can adapt effectively to changes in both the theory and practice of nursing.

Medical simulation and hands on learning are common among nursing education practices. Some nursing schools will carry out hands on demonstrations and practice so that future nurses can learn skills like how to administer specific medications and care for specific patients such as the skills taught in an opioid care training course. While it is clear that the use of Medical simulation in nursing education is important for improving practice, patient safety, and interprofessional team skills, the balance of simulation to clinical time remains in the hands of the institutions.

Although nurses tend to spend a lot of time in nursing school doing simulation and clinical learning, they also spend time in the classroom learning about the care that they will eventually give. This includes both broad science courses as well as very specific courses such as a course specifically about how to better care for addiction patients.

Additionally, newer curriculums within nursing education are requiring future nurses to be educated on patient and workforce diversity. A large step in increasing diversity within nursing is through education. Several research studies have shown diverse patient populations cycle through hospitals on a regular basis and a patients needs are never the same. It is a nurses job to cater to their needs, and ensure the patient is being treated well. During their education, nurses will master the practice of engaging, communicating, and treating unique patient populations, while working with diverse coworkers.

Gallery

Degrees granted
 Practical Nursing Certificate
 Diploma in Nursing
 Associate of Science in Nursing
 Bachelor of Science in Nursing
 Master of Science in Nursing
 Doctor of Nursing Practice
 Doctor of Philosophy in Nursing (PhD)See articles on individual degrees for variations on the exact name.''

List

See also

 Academic dress
 Associate of Science in Nursing
 Bachelor of Science in Nursing
 Diploma in Nursing
 Doctor of Nursing Practice
 HESI exam
 Master of Science in Nursing
 Nurse educator
 Nursing school
 List of nursing credentials
 Timeline of nursing history

Nursing schools:
 Nursing schools by country (category)
 List of nursing colleges in India
 List of nursing schools in Malaysia
 List of nursing schools in the United States
 List of nursing schools in Australia
 List of nursing schools in Canada
 List of nursing schools in Europe
 List of Nursing Training Colleges in Ghana

Reference list

External links

Johnson and Johnson nursing resources
 Eligibility to study Bachelor of Science in Nursing program in Zambia? Texila American University Offers Bachelor of Science in Nursing program
 Where to study in RN-BSN course in Guyana? Texila American University Offers 2 Years Program in its Guyana Campus
 Nursing School In Philadelphia PITC Institute